Euphorbia melanocarpa is a species of flowering plant in the family Euphorbiaceae. It is native to Ecuador and Peru.  Its natural habitat is subtropical or tropical moist montane forests.

References

melanocarpa
Flora of Ecuador
Flora of Peru
Vulnerable plants
Taxonomy articles created by Polbot
Taxa named by Pierre Edmond Boissier